These are the late night schedules on all three networks for each calendar season beginning September 1963. All times are Eastern and Pacific.

Talk/Variety shows are highlighted in yellow, Local News & Programs are highlighted in white.

Monday-Friday

Saturday

By network

ABC

New Series
The Jerry Lewis Show

Not returning from 1962-63
ABC News Final

NBC

Returning Series
The Tonight Show Starring Johnny Carson

United States late night network television schedules
1963 in American television
1964 in American television